Xinghuacun may refer to these places in China:

Xinghuacun, Shanxi, a town in Fenyang, Shanxi
Xinghuacun Subdistrict, Chizhou, Anhui
Xinghuacun Subdistrict, Hefei, Anhui

See also
Xinghua (disambiguation)